Leyton West was a parliamentary constituency in the Municipal Borough of Leyton – then part of Essex but now in Greater London.
It returned one Member of Parliament (MP) to the House of Commons of the Parliament of the United Kingdom, elected by the first past the post system.

History
The constituency was created for the 1918 general election, and abolished for the 1950 general election.

Boundaries

The Urban District of Leyton wards of Central, Forest, Lea Bridge, and Leyton.

Members of Parliament

Elections

Elections in the 1910s

Elections in the 1920s

Elections in the 1930s

Elections in the 1940s 
General Election 1939–40:

Another General Election was required to take place before the end of 1940. The political parties had been making preparations for an election to take place and by the Autumn of 1939, the following candidates had been selected; 
Labour: Reginald Sorensen
Conservative: Eric Hall

References

 

Parliamentary constituencies in Essex (historic)
Parliamentary constituencies in London (historic)
Constituencies of the Parliament of the United Kingdom established in 1918
Constituencies of the Parliament of the United Kingdom disestablished in 1950
Leyton